The 2007–08 season of the Hoofdklasse started in August 2007 and will end in May 2008. Defending champions are Inter Moengotapoe.

Promoted teams 
The following teams are promoted to the Eredivisie at the start of the season:
 Boskamp
 Randjiet Boys

League table

Round 1

Round 2

Round 3

Top scorers

See also 
 2007–08 Eredivisie

References

External links 

SVB Eerste Divisie seasons
1
Surinam